Siegbert Schmeisser (born 24 March 1957) is a retired East German cyclist. He competed at the 1976 Summer Olympics in the individual road race, but failed to reach the finish line. He won the DDR Rundfahrt in 1976 and the Tour of Bulgaria in 1977.

References

1957 births
Living people
Sportspeople from Gera
People from Bezirk Gera
East German male cyclists
Cyclists from Thuringia
Olympic cyclists of East Germany
Cyclists at the 1976 Summer Olympics